"The Second Time" is the first single from Kim Wilde's fourth studio album Teases & Dares (1984). It was re-titled "Go for It" for the North American market.

The track was also Wilde's first release on the MCA record label. Her last few releases on her original label had failed to make an impact on the world's charts, but this one finally put her back into the limelight in several European countries, and made number 29 in the UK. It also marked her second chart entry in the US, where it peaked at number 65.

"The Second Time"/"Go for It" was also the first Wilde song of which there were several remixes released both commercially and promotionally on the 12-inch format. The B-side, "Lovers on a Beach" (an exclusive non-album track), was also extended for the 12-inch single in some nations.

Chart performance

Track listings
All tracks written by Ricki Wilde and Marty Wilde

7" vinyl
 UK: MCA Records/KIM1
 Germany: WEA/259 281-7
 US: MCA Records/MCA-52513 (special limited edition poster sleeve)
 "The Second Time" (US title: "Go for It") – 3:45
 "Lovers On a Beach" – 3:50

12" vinyl
 UK: MCA Records/KIM1T
 Germany: MCA Records/259 281-0
 "The Second Time" (extended version) – 6:30
 "Lovers On a Beach" (extended version) – 7:45

US 12" vinyl
 US: MCA Records MCA-23533 (January 14, 1985)
 "Go for It" (extended dance version) – 7:17
 "Go for It" (Dub version) – 9:32

References

External links
 

Kim Wilde songs
Hi-NRG songs
1984 singles
Songs written by Marty Wilde
Songs written by Ricky Wilde
MCA Records singles
1984 songs